Khazar (Xəzər) is a rural locality (a selo) and the administrative centre of Khazarsky Selsoviet, Derbentsky District, Republic of Dagestan, Russia. The population was 4,809 as of 2010. There are 34 streets.

Geography 
Khazar is located 10 km south of Derbent (the district's administrative centre) by road. Nizhny Dzhalgan and Arablinskoye are the nearest rural localities.

Nationalities 
Azerbaijanis, Aghuls, Lezgins, Tabasarans, Rutuls, Dargins and Russians live there.

References 

Rural localities in Derbentsky District